WD repeat domain phosphoinositide-interacting protein 3 (WIPI-3), also known as WD repeat-containing protein 45-like is a protein that in humans is encoded by the  gene.

Structure and function 

WIPI-3 is a member of the WIPI or SVP1 family of WD40 repeat-containing proteins. The protein contains seven WD40 repeats that are thought to fold into a beta-propeller structure that mediates protein–protein interactions, and a conserved motif for interaction with phospholipids.

See also 
 WIPI protein family

References

Further reading